MobyGames is a commercial website that catalogs information on video games and the people and companies behind them via crowdsourcing. This includes nearly 300,000 games for hundreds of platforms. The site is supported by banner ads and a small number of people paying to become patrons. Founded in 1999, ownership of the site has changed hands several times. It is currently owned by Atari SA.

Content
Prior to being merged into the database, changes go through a leisurely verification process by volunteer "approvers". There is a published standard for game information and copyediting. The most commonly used sources are video game packaging and title and credit screens.

Registered users can rate and review any game. Users can create private or public "have" and "want" lists which can generate a list of games available for trade with other users. The site has an integrated forum. Each listed game can have its own subforum.

History

MobyGames was founded on March 1, 1999 by Jim Leonard and Brian Hirt, then joined by David Berk 18 months later, three friends since high school. Leonard had the idea of sharing information about electronic games with a larger audience.

The database began with games for IBM PC compatibles since that's what the founders were familiar with. After two years, contemporary consoles such as the PlayStation, were added. Older systems were added later. 
Support for arcade video games was added in January 2014 and mainframe computer games in June 2017.

In mid-2010, MobyGames was purchased by GameFly for an undisclosed amount. This was announced to the community post factum and a few major contributors left in protest, refusing to do volunteer work for a commercially owned website.

On December 18, 2013, MobyGames was acquired by Jeremiah Freyholtz, owner of Blue Flame Labs (a San-Francisco-based game and web development company) and VGBoxArt (a site for fan-made video game box art). Blue Flame Labs reverted MobyGames' interface to its pre-overhaul look and feel.

On November 24, 2021, Atari SA announced a potential deal with Blue Flame Labs to purchase MobyGames for $1.5 million. The purchase was completed on 8 March 2022, with Freyholtz remaining as general manager.

References

External links
 

Online game databases
Internet properties established in 1999
Video game review aggregators
Social cataloging applications
2010 mergers and acquisitions
2013 mergers and acquisitions
2022 mergers and acquisitions
Atari